Dmitrii Gennadiyevich Cherniaev (born 14 February 2000) is a Russian Paralympic swimmer. He is a Paralympic, World and a European champion.

Career
Cherniaev represented Russian Paralympic Committee athletes at the 2020 Summer Paralympics in the men's 100 metre breaststroke SB4 event and won a gold medal.

References

2000 births
Living people
Sportspeople from Chelyabinsk
Medalists at the World Para Swimming European Championships
Medalists at the World Para Swimming Championships
Paralympic swimmers of Russia
Swimmers at the 2020 Summer Paralympics
Medalists at the 2020 Summer Paralympics
Paralympic medalists in swimming
Paralympic gold medalists for the Russian Paralympic Committee athletes
Russian male breaststroke swimmers
S5-classified Paralympic swimmers